Zhirnov is the name of several inhabited localities in Russia.

Urban localities
Zhirnov, Rostov Oblast, a settlement under the administrative jurisdiction of Zhirnovskoye Rural Settlement in Tatsinsky District of Rostov Oblast

Rural localities
Zhirnov, Orenburg Oblast, a settlement in Stepnoy Selsoviet of Tashlinsky District of Orenburg Oblast